The Literary Society of 1842 was a group of prominent Chileans from the social, political, and literary fields. Its goals were promoting originality among the nation's writers, strengthening the social quality of literature, and rejecting foreign literary models. The group held 86 meetings from 5 March 1842 to 1 August 1843.

Members 
It had over 40 members, including the following:

References

External links 
 Wikibooks has a book on cultural transformations of Chile in the nineteenth century 
 Sociedad Literaria de 1842 at Memoria Chilena 

1842 establishments in Chile
1843 disestablishments
Chilean literature
Andrés Bello
Organizations established in 1842
Cultural organisations based in Chile